The 3-Hydroxypropionate bicycle, also known as the 3-Hydroxypropionate pathway, is a process that allows some bacteria to generate 3-Hydroxypropionate utilizing carbon dioxide. In this pathway CO2 is fixed (i.e. incorporated) by the action of two enzymes, acetyl-CoA carboxylase and propionyl-CoA carboxylase.  These enzymes generate malonyl-CoA and (S)-methylmalonyl-CoA, respectively. Malonyl-CoA, in a series of reactions is further split into acetyl-CoA and glyoxylate.  Glyoxylate is incorporated into beta-methylmalyl-coA which is then split, again through a series of reactions to release pyruvate as well as acetate, which is used to replenish the cycle. This pathway has been demonstrated in Chloroflexus, a nonsulfur photosynthetic bacterium, however other studies suggest that 3-hydroxypropionate bicycle is utilized by several chemotrophic archaea.

See also
 Carbon fixation

References

External links
 Pathways

Metabolic pathways